Marmaduke Wyvill (1791–1872) was an English Whig politician.

Life
The eldest son of Christopher Wyvill by his second marriage, to Sarah Codling, he was educated at Eton College and Trinity College, Cambridge, where he matriculated in 1810. In difficulty financially, he did not stand again in 1830.

Family
Wyvill married Rachel Milnes, second daughter of Richard Slater Milnes MP of Fryston Hall, Yorkshire. They had three sons and four daughters. The eldest son Marmaduke, also a Member of Parliament, is known as a chess player.

Notes

1791 births
1872 deaths
Members of the Parliament of the United Kingdom for English constituencies
UK MPs 1820–1826
UK MPs 1826–1830
People educated at Eton College
Alumni of Trinity College, Cambridge
Politicians from York